Jean Amédée Hoerni (September 26, 1924 – January 12, 1997) was a Swiss-American engineer. He was a silicon transistor pioneer, and a member of the "traitorous eight". He developed the planar process, an important technology for reliably fabricating and manufacturing semiconductor devices, such as transistors and integrated circuits.

Biography
Hoerni was born on September 26, 1924 in Geneva, Switzerland. He received his B.S. in Mathematics from the University of Geneva and two Ph.D.s in Physics; one from the University of Geneva and the other from the University of Cambridge.

In 1952, he moved to the United States to work at the California Institute of Technology, where he became acquainted with William Shockley, a physicist at Bell Labs who was intimately involved with the creation of the transistor.

A few years later, Shockley recruited Hoerni to work with him at the newly founded Shockley Semiconductor Laboratory division of Beckman Instruments in Mountain View, California. But Shockley's strange behavior compelled the so-called "traitorous eight" (Hoerni, Julius Blank, Victor Grinich, Eugene Kleiner, Jay Last, Gordon Moore, Robert Noyce and Sheldon Roberts) to leave his laboratory and create the Fairchild Semiconductor corporation.

In 1958, Hoerni attended an Electrochemical Society meeting, where Bell Labs engineer Mohamed Atalla presented a paper about the passivation of p–n junctions by oxide, and demonstrated silicon dioxide's passivating effect on a silicon surface. Hoerni was intrigued, and came up with the concept of planar technology one morning while thinking about Atalla's device. Taking advantage of silicon dioxide's passivating effect on the silicon surface, Hoerni proposed to make transistors that were protected by a layer of silicon dioxide.

The planar process was invented by Jean Hoerni, with his first patent filed in May 1959. The planar process was critical in the invention of Silicon Integrated circuit by Robert Noyce. Noyce built on Hoerni's work with his conception of an integrated circuit, which added a layer of metal to the top of Hoerni's basic structure to connect different components, such as transistors, capacitors, or resistors, located on the same piece of silicon. The planar process provided a powerful way of implementing an integrated circuit that was superior to earlier conceptions of the device. With Noyce, Jack Kilby from Texas Instruments is usually credited with the invention of the integrated circuit, but Kilby's IC was based on Germanium. As it turns out, Silicon ICs have numerous advantages over germanium. The name "Silicon Valley" refers to this silicon.

Along with the "traitorous eight" alumni Jay Last and Sheldon Roberts, Hoerni founded Amelco (known now as Teledyne) in 1961.

In 1964, he founded Union Carbide Electronics, and in 1967, he founded Intersil, where he became a pioneer of low-voltage CMOS-Integrated Circuits.

He was awarded the Edward Longstreth Medal from the Franklin Institute in 1969 and the McDowell Award in 1972.

Hoerni died of myelofibrosis on January 12, 1997 in Seattle, Washington. He was 72.

Personal life
He was married to Anne Marie Hoerni and had three children: Annie Blackwell, Susan Killham, and Michael Hoerni. He had one brother, Marc Hoerni.   His second marriage to Ruth Carmona also ended in divorce. Hoerni married Jennifer Wilson in 1993.

Philanthropy 
An avid mountain climber, Hoerni often visited the Karakoram Mountains in Pakistan and was moved by the poverty of the Balti mountain people who lived there. He contributed the lion's share, $30,000, to Greg Mortenson's project to build a school in the remote village of Korphe, and later founded the Central Asia Institute with an endowment of $1 million to continue providing services for them after his death. Hoerni named Greg Mortenson as the first Executive Director of the organization, which continues to build schools in Pakistan and Afghanistan.

In December 2007, an article was published by Michael Riordan on Hoerni and his planar process in IEEE Spectrum. The author claimed that Jay Last pointed out that Hoerni had incredible stamina and could hike for hours on little food or water.

Patents 

 1962, U.S. Patent 3,025,589 A (Espanet) «Method of manufacturing semiconductor devices», assigned to Fairchild Camera and Instrument Corp.
 1962, U.S. Patent 3,064,167 A (Espanet) «Semiconductor device», assigned to Fairchild Camera and Instrument Corp.
 1963, U.S. Patent 3,108,914 A (Espanet), «Transistor manufacturing process», assigned to Fairchild Camera and Instrument Corp.

References 

1924 births
1997 deaths
Swiss emigrants to the United States
Silicon Valley people
American computer businesspeople
American mountain climbers
20th-century American businesspeople
Swiss expatriates in the United Kingdom
Scientists at Shockley Semiconductor Laboratory